This is a list of current and former members of the Islamic State of Iraq and the Levant (ISIL), or also known as Islamic State of Iraq and Syria (ISIS) and its previous incarnations, including operating as a branch of al-Qaeda known as al-Qaeda in Iraq (AQI), from 2004 to 2006. Little is known about the leadership or members, as most use assumed names and many fight or appear in video with covered faces. Most of its members are former officers and soldiers of Saddam Hussein's regime after its collapse in 2003.

Leadership and branches

Current known personnel (in descending order by approximate rank) 
 Abu al-Hussein al-Husseini al-Qurashi, caliph since 30 November 2022.
 Abu Umar al-Muhajir, spokesman since 10 March 2022.
 Abu Ali al-Tunisi, leader of manufacturing for ISIS in Iraq.
 Omar al-Furkan, high ranking ISIL fighter. Candidate for 2nd ISIL Caliph. Member of ISIL's leading council.
 Ayoub Rakawi, high ranking ISIL fighter. Member of ISIL's leading council. Candidate for 2nd ISIL Caliph following the death of Baghdadi.
 Faysal Ahmad Ali al-Zahrani (born 1986), top Saudi oil official.
 Abu Yusaf, senior security official, European. 
 Abu Muhammad al-Jazrawi, head of Hisbah. (Islamic religious police)
 Abu Jandal al-Masri, Chief of Information in Raqqa, Egyptian.
 Abu Suleyman al-Firansi - Moroccan, former soldier of the French Foreign Legion, worked with the Brussels Islamic State terror cell and is one of the suspected masterminds behind the November 2015 Paris attacks.
 Fatiha Mejjati (born 1961), senior female commander, Moroccan.
 Abu Ahmed (senior official interviewed by The Guardian)
 Bajro Ikanović (born 1976), senior leader and trainer, active in Syria and Iraq (since 2013), Bosnian.
 Zulfi Hoxha – "Abu Hamza al-Amriki" (born 1992), senior commander and recruiter, active in Syria and Iraq (since 2015), Albanian-American.
 Ahlam al-Nasr, propagandist (poet by profession), Syrian.
 Abdullah Al-Belgian, preacher and propagandist.
 Mawlavi Habib Ur Rahman – successor to Qari Hekmat in the north of Afghanistan.
 Abu Nuh – (ISIS figure)
 Muhammad Yasin Ahram Pérez, known as Abu Lais Al Qurtubí, propagandist after the 2017 Barcelona attacks.
 Abu Salman al-Andalusí, propagandist after the 2017 Barcelona attacks.
 Abu Adam al-Australi, fighter, who is thought to be Mounir Raad.
 Abu Laith al-Jazerwe, fighter.

Foreign ISIL branches and governors of ISIL territories
 Mubarak Mohammed al-Otaibi, Syria-based deputy leader of operations in Saudi Arabia.
 Abu Yasir Hassan, Leader of the Islamic State's Mozambique province.
 Abdul Qadir Mumin, Leader of the Islamic State in Somalia.
 Musa Baluku, Leader of Islamic State of Iraq and the Levant - Central Africa Province.
 Shahab al-Muhajir, Leader of Islamic State of Iraq and the Levant – Khorasan Province.
 Abu Abdillah al-Muhajir, Leader of Islamic State of Iraq and the Levant - East Asia Province.
 Abu Habib al-Libi, senior Libyan leader, served in both Iraq and Libya.
 Muhammad Sholeh Ibrahim, Indonesian leader.
 Jalaluddin al-Tunisi, ISIL leader in Tripoli.
 Abu Hajar al-Hashemi, Leader of ISIL Sinai Province.
 Abu al-Baraa el-Azdi, Governor in ISIL "Province" of Eastern Libya.
 Abu Fatima al-Jaheishi, Governor of 'South and Central Euphrates' region.

Former leaders and senior personnel

Former leaders (in ascending order by date of capture or death)
 Abu Musab al-Zarqawi (founder; killed in June 2006)
 Abu Ayyub al-Masri (killed in April 2010)
 Abu Omar al-Baghdadi (killed in April 2010)
 Al-Nasser Lideen Allah Abu Suleiman (head of military shura; killed in February 2011)
 Haji Bakr (strategic head and top deputy in Syria, killed in January 2014)
 Abu Abdulrahman al-Bilawi (head of Military Shura, killed in June 2014)
 Abu Khattab al-Kurdi, (senior commander, killed on November 27th, 2014)
 Abu Mohannad al-Sweidawi (member of Military Shura; killed in November 2014)
 Reda Seyam (senior education official, killed in December 2014)
 Abu Sayyaf (senior leader overseeing ISIL's gas and oil operations, killed in May 2015)
 Umm Sayyaf (senior leader and spouse of Abu Sayyaf, captured in May 2015)
 Ali Awni al-Harzi (killed in June 2015)
 Tariq bin al-Tahar bin al-Falih al-'Awni al-Harzi (emir of suicide bombers, fundraiser killed in June 2015)
 Abu Muslim al-Turkmani (also known as Abu Mutaz al-Qurashi, deputy leader in charge of Iraq; killed on 18 August 2015)
 Abu Nabil al-Anbari (Leader of ISIL in Libya, killed in an airstrike in November 2015)
 Abu Saleh, senior Iraqi leader (killed in 2015)
 Mullah Abdul Rauf (deputy leader of Wilayat Khorasan; killed in 2015)
 Abdul Rahim Muslim Dost (recruiter for Wilayat Khorasan, left in 2015)
 Yunis Hunnar (Leader of the Sheikh Omar Hadid Brigade, killed in June 2015).
 Abu Atheer Amr al-Absi (governor of Aleppo province and coordinator of the Islamic State's media operations, killed in March 2016)
 Abu Ala al-Afri (also known as Abu Ali al-Anbari, Deputy leader of ISIL, killed in March 2016)
 Abu Waheeb (commander in Al Anbar, Iraq; killed in May 2016)
 Abu Omar al-Shishani (field commander in Syria, killed in July 2016)
 Abu Wardah, (senior leader in Sulawesi, Indonesia, killed in July 2016)
 Hafiz Saeed Khan, (Leader of ISIL Khorasan Province, killed in July 2016)
 Abu Mohammad al-Adnani, (official spokesperson and senior leader, killed in August 2016)
 Rustam Asildarov, (Leader of ISIL North Caucausus Province, killed in December 2016)
 Abu Jandal al-Kuwaiti, (second-in-command in Syria, Kuwaiti, killed in December 2016)
 Ahmad Abousamra, (chief editor of Dabiq, killed near al-Thawrah, Syria in January 2017)
 Zainuri Kamaruddin, (Malaysian commander of Katibah Nusantara, killed in Raqqa in January 2017)
 Abu Bilal al-Harbi, (governor of Islamic State of Iraq and the Levant – Yemen Province, killed in March 2017)
 Abdul Haseeb Logari, (governor of Islamic State of Iraq and the Levant – Khorasan Province, killed in April 2017 in US special forces raid)
 Turki al-Binali, (Bahraini Islamic scholar & top religious adviser, killed in May 2017 in Raqqa, Syria)
 Lavdrim Muhaxheri, (Albanian commander, killed in June 2017 in Syria)
 Abu Khattab al-Tunisi, (third-highest ranking commander in Syria, killed in June 2017 in Raqqa)
 Abdul Rahman Ghaleb, (governor of Islamic State of Iraq and the Levant – Khorasan Province, killed in July 2017 in Kunar Province, Afghanistan)
 Gulmurod Khalimov, (Russian commander and recruiter, killed near Deir ez-Zor, Syria on 3 September 2017)
 Abu Muhammad al-Shimali, (key facilitator for foreign fighters, killed near Deir ez-Zor, Syria on 3 September 2017)
 Isnilon Hapilon, (leader of Abu Sayyaf / ISIL "Province" of the Philippines, killed in Marawi, Philippines on 16 October 2017)
 Aqsa Mahmood (born 1993) (senior female recruiter, Scottish, probably killed)
 Abu Osama al-Masri, (Leader of Islamic State of Iraq and the Levant - Sinai Province, killed on 15 November 2018)
 Ali Moussa Al-Shawakh – "Abu Luqman" (born 1973), governor of Raqqah, active in Syria (since 2011), Syrian, reportedly killed by an Iraqi airstrike on 17 April 2018
 Bahrun Naim, (Indonesian commander, killed in Ash Shafa, Syria on 8 June 2018)
 Mohamed Mahmoud – "Abu Usama al-Gharib" (Egyptian-Austrian leader, killed in Syria on 28 November 2018)
 Abu Osama al-Muhajer, (leader of Islamic State of Iraq and the Levant – Yemen Province, captured on 25 June 2019)
 Abu Bakr al-Baghdadi (Founder and Leader, killed on 27 October 2019)
 Abul-Hasan al-Muhajir (Spokesman and senior leader, named as a possible successor for al-Baghdadi; killed in an airstrike on 27 October 2019)
 Abu Abdul Bari - Also known as "Shifa Ali Bashir Muhammad Gerges" and "Shifa al-Nima", (senior Mufti, captured on 18 January 2020)
 Mawlawi Aslam Farooqi, (Leader of Islamic State of Iraq and the Levant – Khorasan Province, captured on 4 April 2020)
 Abdullah Qardash, (High ranking leader, captured on 20 May 2020)
 Mu'taz Numan 'Abd Nayif Najm al-Jaburi, (senior leader and bomb-maker, killed on 26 May 2020)
 Hatib Hajan Sawadjaan, (Leader of Abu Sayyaf / ISIL "Province" of the Philippines, killed on 6 July 2020)
 Abdul Qader al-Najdi, (Leader of Islamic State of Iraq and the Levant in Libya, killed on 23 September 2020)
 Aslan Byutukayev, (Chechen commander of Riyad-us Saliheen Brigade of Martyrs / ISIL "Province" of the Caucasus, killed on 20 January 2021)
 Abu Yasser al-Issawi, (Senior commander claiming to be the leader of the group in Iraq and its "deputy caliph", killed by Iraqi security forces and death announced on 28 January 2021)
 Muhammad Khadir Musa Ramadan, (senior leader and propagandist, killed in 2021)
 Abubakar Shekau, (Leader of Boko Haram, killed on 19 May 2021)
 Adnan Abu Walid al-Sahrawi, (Leader of Islamic State in the Greater Sahara, killed on 17 August 2021)
 Abu Musab al-Barnawi, (Leader of Islamic State in West Africa, killed in August 2021)
 Ali Kalora, (Leader of East Indonesia Mujahideen, killed on 18 September 2021)
 Sami Jasim Muhammad al-Jaburi - Also known as "Hajji Hamid", (manager of finances, captured in October 2021)
 Malam Bako, (Leader of Islamic State in West Africa, killed in October 2021)
 Allison Elizabeth Fluke-Ekren, (Leader of Khatibah Nusaybah, captured in 2021)
 Abu Ibrahim al-Hashimi al-Qurashi, (Leader, killed on 3 February 2022)
 Abu Hamza al-Qurashi, (Spokesman, killed in 2022)
 Sani Shuwaram, (Leading commander of the Islamic State in West Africa, killed in February 2022)
 Maher al-Agal, (Leader of ISIL in Syria, killed in July 2022)
 Abu al-Hasan al-Hashimi al-Qurashi (Leader, killed in October 2022)
 Anas Sharkas – "Abu Ali al-Shishani" (Battalion  commander, Syrian, killed in December 2022)
 Hamza al-Homsi (Senior leader, Syrian, killed in February 2023).

Other former personnel 
 Abu Mansour (informal ambassador of ISIS in Turkey)
 Abdul Hadi Daghlas (Al-Zarqawi's top Lieutenant, killed in 2003)
 Abu Anas al-Shami (Strategist, and Al-Zarqawi's adviser, killed in 2004)
 Abu Azzam (killed in 2005)
 Abu Omar al-Kurdi (captured in 2005)
 Abdul Hadi al-Iraqi (captured in 2006)
 Sheik Abd-Al-Rahman (killed in 2006)
 Hamid Juma Faris Jouri al-Saeedi (captured in 2006)
 Abu Yaqub al-Masri (killed in 2007)
 Haitham al-Badri (killed in 2007)
 Khaled al-Mashhadani (captured in 2007)
 Mahir al-Zubaydi (killed in 2008)
 Mohamed Moumou (killed in 2008)
 Huthaifa al-Batawi (killed in 2011)
 Abu Usamah al-Maghrebi, (military commander, killed in March 2014)
 Bilal Bosnić, (Bosnian Recruiter, captured in 2014)
 Zakaryah Raad (1992-2014), fighter, died in June 2014 fighting with ISIL in the Middle East.
 Salahedin Ghaitun, known by his nom de guerre Abou Tamima, fighter, died on 15 July 2014 from a gun wound in the head.
 Abu Mosa, press officer, was killed on 22 August 2014 in an attack for al-Tabqa air base in Raqqa Governorate during the Syrian Civil War.
 Douglas McCain (killed in August 2014)
 Noureddine El Mejdoubi, known as Issa Abu, fighter, was arrested and imprisoned in Nanclares.
 Hassan Saeed Al-Jabouri (replacement Mosul Governor, killed in 2014)
 Abu Jurnas (Mosul Governor, killed in December 2014)
 Bastian Vasquez, known by his nom de guerre Abu Safiyyah, propagandist, died between January and May in an infighting incident.
 Ahmed al-Ruwaysi (killed in Sirte, Libya in 2015)
 Maher Meshaal, Saudi nasheed singer (killed in 2015)
 Selim Suleiman al-Haram (a leader of Egypt branch, killed in 2015)
 Yusuf al-Hindi (former ISIL leader in India, killed in 2015)
 Junaid Hussain (recruiter and hacker, killed in August 2015)
 Mohammed Emwazi, nicknamed "Jihadi John" (participant in beheading videos; killed on 12 November 2015 near Raqqa in a US air strike)
 Mohamed Hamduch, known as Kokito Castillejos, recruiter and fighter who died in Aleppo on 1 December 2015.
 Waleed Jaseem al-Alwani – "Abu Ahmad al-Alwani", member of Military Shura, Iraqi, killed 27 December 2015.
 Ubaydullah Hussain, (Norwegian Recruiter, captured in December 2015)
 Muhammad "Bada" Sajid – (former Indian Mujahideen member, ISIS recruiter, killed in Syria in 2015)
 Neil Prakash (Australian ISIS recruiter, captured in 2016)
 Raphael Hostey (British recruiter and fighter, killed on May 5, 2016)
 Ali Aswad al-Jiburi (member of Shura council, killed on May 18, 2016)
 Musa Cerantonio (Australian ISIS preacher, captured on May 19, 2016)
 Abu al-Harith (Sudanese ISIS preacher and leader of Sirte branch, killed in Sirte, Libya in June 2016)
 Abu Muhammad al-Furqan (ISIS information minister, killed in September 2016 in Raqqa)
 Abu Walaa, (German propagandist, captured on November 8, 2016)
 Abu Rumaysah (born 1983) (British fighter, possibly killed in 2017)
 Abu Anas al-Iraqi, (Finance chief of ISIS, killed in a Delta Force raid at Dez ez-Zor in January 2017)
 Ridvan Haqifi (1990–2017), commander and recruiter, active in Syria and Iraq, Kosovo Albanian. Killed on 8 February 2017.
 Abu Umar al-Almani (1986-2017), commander and recruiter, German. Killed on 25 March 2017.
 Hussein Al-Dhufairi, (senior Kuwaiti Leader, captured in Manila, Philippines on 6 April 2017)
 Muhammad Wanndy Mohamed Jedi, (Senior Indonesian Leader, killed in April 2017)
 Fawaz Muhammad Jubayr al-Rawi (Facilitator, killed in a US airstrike at Abu Kamal on 16 June 2017)
 Sally-Anne Jones – "Umm Hussain al-Britani" (1968–2017), recruiter, British. Killed in June 2017.
 Khaled Sharrouf, foreign fighter who was presumably killed in air strike on 11 August 2017.
 Abdullah el-Faisal – propagandist and recruiter, Jamaican. Captured on 25 August 2017.
 Yahya al-Bahrumi – (American fighter, killed in October 2017)
 Akhmed Chatayev (1980–2017), trainer and organizer of activity against Russian diplomatic missions, Chechnyan. Killed on 22 November 2017 in Tbilisi by Georgian security forces.
 Abu Natheer al-Muhajir – (deputy emir of the Salahuddin State, killed on 25 November 2017)
 Denis Cuspert – "Abu Talha al-Almani" (1975–2018), German recruiter active since 2013. Killed in Gharanij, Syria on 17 January 2018.
 "The Beatles", hostage torturers and executioners, British.
 Ismail al-Eithawi – (Top aide to Baghdadi, captured in February 2018)
 Mohammed Haydar Zammar (captured in March 2018)
 Qari Hekmat – (High-ranking commander of IS's Afghan franchise in the northern province of Jowzjan, killed on 7 April 2018)
 Nasser Abu Zaqul – (Central Sinai commander of the Islamic State, killed on 18 April 2018)
 Abu Huzaifa al-Kanadi – (Canadian IS recruit, returned to Canada in 2016)
 Abu Huzeifa Al-Iraqi – (High-ranking IS commander, killed in April 2018)
 Abu Walid al-Shishany – (close aid and right-hand man to Baghdadi, killed on 20 April 2018)
 Qari Zahid – (Key Islamic State commander also known as Perai, killed on 24 April 2018)
 Saleh Nasser Fadhl al-Bakshi – (senior Islamic State commander; also known as the "Prince" for the Aden area; killed on 28 April 2018)
 Imad Jibar, fighter, was arrested in Turkey.
 Bahrumsyah – (senior South-Asian commander and highest ranking Indonesian to fight with the IS; reported killed in April 2018)
 Khaled al-Loweizi – (IS member, arrested on 3 May 2018)
 Saddam al-Jammal – (Deputy ISIL governor of their Euphrates province, captured on 9 May 2018)
 Mohammed al-Qadeer – (Top IS commander, captured on 9 May 2018)
 Omar al-Karbouli – (Top IS commander, captured on 9 May 2018)
 Essam al-Zawbai – (Top IS commander, captured on 9 May 2018)
 Sharmeena Begum – (British fighter, Missing since June 2018)
 Tareq Kamleh – (foreign recruiter, killed on 8 June 2018)
 Mufti Nemat – (leading ISIL commander in northern Afghanistan, surrendered on 1 August 2018)
 Mahad Moalim – (senior Islamic State commander in Somalia, killed on 23 October 2018)
 Mark John Taylor – (foreign fighter from New Zealand, captured by Kurdish Forces in December 2018)
 Christian Emde - (German Commander, killed in late 2018)
 Mohammed Khalifa – (Canadian propagandist, captured in January 2019)
 Shamima Begum – (British fighter, captured in February 2019)
 Umm Hamza – (former Leader of Al-Khansaa Brigade, surrendered on 24 February 2019)
 Akel Zainal - (Indonesian Commander, killed in March 2019)
 Mullah Krekar – (Norwegian Recruiter and Leader of Rawti Shax, arrested on 16 July 2019)
Abu al-Ward al-Iraqi – (IS Oil Official, killed in raid in Deir al-Zour province on 14 January 2020)
 Abdel-Majed Abdel Bary – (foreign fighter and recruiter, captured in Almería, Spain on 21 April 2020)
 Bilal al-Sudani (killed in northern Somalia on January 25, 2023)

See also
 Brussels Islamic State terror cell
 The Beatles (terrorist cell)
 List of al-Qaeda members
 Republican Guard (Iraq)

References

Sources

 
Lists of criminals
Terrorism-related lists